John Lockwood may refer to:

Blessed John Lockwood (priest) (1555–1642), English Roman Catholic priest and martyr
John Lockwood (British politician) (1890–1983), English Conservative Party politician, Member of Parliament, 1931–1935, 1950–1955
Sir John Lockwood (classicist) (1903–1965), British classicist and university administrator
Johnny Lockwood (1920–2013), British/Australian actor
John Lockwood (Australian politician) (born 1936), member of the Queensland Legislative Assembly

See also
John Lockwood Kipling (1837−1911), English art teacher, illustrator, and museum curator who spent most of his career in British India, father of the author Rudyard Kipling